Booby Trap is a 1957 black and white British film, written by Peter Bryan and directed by Henry Cass.

Plot

A scientist has invented a pen which will explode if a bell rings at a certain frequency, although it is safe as long as the cap is left on. The absent-minded professor leaves behind his case (containing the pen) in a taxi. The next customer in the taxi, a man named Sammy, takes the case, but is disappointed with the contents. There follow a variety of situations in which the pen might accidentally be set off.

Cast

 Harry Fowler as Sammy
 Tony Quinn as Prof. Hasdane
 Sydney Tafler as Mr. Hunter
 Patti Morgan as Jackie
 Jacques Cey as Bentley.

References

1957 films
British crime thriller films
Films directed by Henry Cass
1950s English-language films
1950s British films